Sadia Rashid (born 1946) is a Pakistani educationist who is the current president of Hamdard Pakistan, chancellor of the Hamdard University and president of the Pakistan-Japan Cultural Association (PJCA).

Early life
She was born in 1946 in Sitaram Bazar, Old Delhi, India to Hakim Said ( Shaheed ) and Naimat Begum. Her ancestors came from Kashgar (now Kashi, Xinjiang, China) to the Indian subcontinent, in the reign of the Mughal emperor, Shah Alam. They first stayed at Peshawar for about eighteen years, then moved to Multan and lastly settled down at Delhi. In January 1948, her family migrated to Karachi after the establishment of Pakistan.

She received her education from St Joseph's Convent School, Karachi and St Joseph's College, Karachi. Then she completed her Masters of Arts in Sociology from Karachi University.

Personal life
In 1970, she married a barrister, Rashid Munir Ahmad with whom she has three daughters, MaheNeemah (known as Maham), Amena Mian and Fatema Zahra Munir Ahmed, who is currently serving as MD/CEO Hamdard Lab (Waqf) Pak.

On 7 February 2022, her husband Rashid Munir Ahmad died.

Awards
In February 2019, Sadia was awarded the Order of the Rising Sun, Gold Rays with Neck Ribbon, from the Japanese government in recognition of "her contribution for promoting cultural relations and mutual understanding between Japan and Pakistan."

References

1946 births
Living people
Pakistani people of Uyghur descent
Recipients of the Order of the Rising Sun, 3rd class
People from Karachi
Pakistani educators